Route 227 is a provincial highway located in the Montérégie region of Quebec. The highway runs from Venise-en-Québec at the junction of Route 202 in the northwestern shores of Lake Champlain and ends at the junction of Autoroute 20 in Sainte-Marie-Madeleine, near Mont-Saint-Hilaire. It briefly overlaps Route 229 in Saint-Jean-Baptiste.

Municipalities along Route 227
 Venise-en-Québec
 Saint-Sébastien
 Saint-Alexandre
 Mont-Saint-Grégoire
 Sainte-Brigide-d'Iberville
 Sainte-Angèle-de-Monnoir
 Marieville
 Saint-Jean-Baptiste
 Sainte-Madeleine 
 Sainte-Marie-Madeleine

See also
 List of Quebec provincial highways

References

External links 
 Official Transports Quebec Road Network Map 
 Route 227 on Google Maps

227